Kiran Arunasalam (born 1 June 1995) is an Australian field hockey player who plays as a forward.

Life and career
Arunasalam was born on 1 June 1995 in Melbourne to Malaysian Indian parents who migrated from Malaysia to Australia in the 1980s. His family traces back its roots to the Indian town of Tirupattur, Tamil Nadu. He picked up the sport at the age of four.

Arunasalam was first selected in the Australian junior team in 2015. He was part of the Australian squad that won the 2016 Sultan of Johor Cup in Malaysia. He was also part of the national team that finished fourth at the 2016 Men's Hockey Junior World Cup in India. He made his senior team debut in 2017.

As of 2016, Arunasalam studies marketing at the Swinburne University in Melbourne.

References

1995 births
Living people
Australian male field hockey players
Australian people of Indian descent
Field hockey players from Melbourne
Swinburne University of Technology alumni